Prostanna was a town of ancient Pisidia or of Lycaonia inhabited during Hellenistic, Roman, and Byzantine times. It was a bishopric; no longer the seat of a residential bishop, it remains a titular see of the Roman Catholic Church.

Its site is located near Eğirdir in Asiatic Turkey.

References

Populated places in Pisidia
Populated places in ancient Lycaonia
Former populated places in Turkey
Roman towns and cities in Turkey
Populated places of the Byzantine Empire
History of Isparta Province
Catholic titular sees in Asia
Eğirdir District